Simcoe South was a federal electoral district represented in the House of Commons of Canada from 1867 to 1925, and from 1979 to 1988. It was located north of Toronto in the province of Ontario. It was initially created by the British North America Act of 1867 when the County of Simcoe was divided into two ridings, to be called the South and North Ridings in the Legislative Assembly of the Province of Canada.

The South Riding consisted of the Townships of West Gwillimbury, Tecumseh, Innisfil, Essa, Tossorontio, Mulmur, and the Village of Bradford.

In 1882, the electoral district of the County of Simcoe was divided into three ridings. The South Riding consisted of the townships of Mulmur, Tossorontio, Essa, Innisfil, and Tecumseth, and the village of Alliston.

In 1903, the south riding was redefined to consist of the townships of Adjala, Essa, Gwillimbury West, Innisfil, Tecumseth and Tossorontio, the towns of Alliston and Barrie, and the villages of Beeton, Bradford and Tottenham.

The electoral district was abolished in 1924 when it was incorporated into Dufferin—Simcoe riding.

It was recreated in 1976 from parts of Grey—Simcoe, Peel—Dufferin—Simcoe and York—Simcoe ridings. It consisted of the City of Barrie and the Townships of Essa, Flos, Innisfil, Tecumseth, Vespra and West Gwillimbury, but excluding the Towns of Alliston and Wasaga Beach.

The electoral district was abolished in 1987 when it was redistributed between Simcoe Centre, Simcoe North and York—Simcoe ridings.

Members of Parliament

This riding has elected the following Members of Parliament:

Election results

Simcoe South, 1867–1925

Simcoe South, 1979–1988

See also 

 List of Canadian federal electoral districts
 Past Canadian electoral districts

External links 

 Website of the Parliament of Canada

Former federal electoral districts of Ontario